Anne Eckner (born 26 December 1979) is a German short track speed skater. She competed in the women's 3000 metre relay event at the 1998 Winter Olympics.

References

External links
 

1979 births
Living people
German female short track speed skaters
Olympic short track speed skaters of Germany
Short track speed skaters at the 1998 Winter Olympics
Sportspeople from Rostock